Morr Music is an independent record label based in Berlin, Germany. It was founded in 1999 by Thomas Morr. Most artists on the label fall into the categories of intelligent dance music, electronica and dreampop, but all reflect Thomas Morr's personal taste. This results in a cohesive aesthetic observable in both the aural and visual elements of this label's releases.

Style
The label's style of music stems from the hybridization of electronica and indie or shoegazer rock. Generally speaking, artists on this label combine these elements in a way that can appeal to pop, dance, and rock fans alike. The shoegazing sound is represented here through the deployment of pop-rock melodies buried under layers of digital signal processing effects, such as distortion and reverb. Many music journalism sites reference bands such as My Bloody Valentine, Cocteau Twins, and Slowdive when reviewing Morr Music releases. A perfect testament to this overlap in styles is the Morr Music two-disc compilation album Blue Skied an' Clear, which contains a full disc of artists reworking Slowdive tracks in the style of electronica typically associated with Morr Music.

Plinkerpop

Plinkerpop (or Plinker music) is a genre of rock music, whose name was coined by the producer Thomas Morr, the founder of record company Morr Music. First popularized by the German musical group Herrmann & Kleine, the genre is noted for its unique and engaging style in which "glitchy" synthetic tones are intermixed with what is described as "genuine pop bliss".

Plinkerpop was initially popularized by the now-defunct German band Herrmann & Kleine. While Herrmann & Kleine disbanded in 2005, plinkerpop still enjoys mainstream acceptance in the German and British alternative music scenes.

Roster
 The American Analog Set
 Benni Hemm Hemm
 F. S. Blumm
 Borko
 Butcher the Bar
 Contriva
 Couch
 Duo 505
 Electric President
 Fenster
 B. Fleischmann
 Herrmann & Kleine
 The Go Find
 Guther
 Isan
 It's a Musical
 Christian Kleine
 Lali Puna
 Limp
 Man's Best Friend
 Manual
 Ms. John Soda
 múm
 Opiate
 The Notwist
 Orcas
 Pascal Pinon
 People Press Play
 Phonem
 Populous
 Masha Qrella
 Radical Face
 Seabear
 Seavault
 Sin Fang
 Sóley
 Solvent
 Styrofoam
 Surf City
 Tarwater
 Tied & Tickled Trio

References

External links 
 Morr Music
 Morr Music's Myspace page
 Morr Music on Discogs.com
 Boomkat Article

German record labels
Record labels established in 1991
German independent record labels
Electronic music record labels
Electronic dance music record labels
IFPI members
1991 establishments in Germany